Several Canadian naval units have been named HMCS Brandon.

  (I), a  that served in the Royal Canadian Navy during the Battle of the Atlantic.

Battle honours
Atlantic, 1941–45
Gulf of St. Lawrence, 1944

References

Directorate of History and Heritage - HMCS Brandon 

Royal Canadian Navy ship names